William F. Clayton (September 20, 1923 – April 20, 2017) was an American politician and U.S. Attorney for District of South Dakota.

Early life and education
Clayton graduated from the University of South Dakota School of Law in 1951.

Career
He was a member of the South Dakota House of Representatives. He was a veteran of World War II, with the United States Army. He was later an attorney. He was the United States Attorney for the District of South Dakota from 1969 until 1977.

References

1923 births
2017 deaths
Republican Party members of the South Dakota House of Representatives
United States Attorneys for the District of South Dakota
University of South Dakota School of Law alumni